Maria Gardfjell (born 1965) is a Swedish politician.  she serves as Member of the Riksdag representing the constituency of Uppsala County.

She is a biologist and geoscientist.

References 

Living people
1965 births
Place of birth missing (living people)
21st-century Swedish politicians
21st-century Swedish women politicians
Members of the Riksdag 2018–2022
Members of the Riksdag from the Green Party
Women members of the Riksdag
Stockholm University alumni